Roaches Line is a local service district and designated place in the Canadian province of Newfoundland and Labrador. It is on the western side of Conception Bay and south of Bay Roberts.

Roaches Line (Route 70) connects the Conception Bay Highway (Route 60) at Cupids Crossing and South River with the Trans Canada Highway (Route 1) and Veterans' Memorial Highway (Route 75).

Geography 
Roaches Line is in Newfoundland within Subdivision M of Division No. 1. It is primarily a farming area.

Demographics 

Attractions 
Roaches Line is known for its landmark life-sized, weathervane horse statue atop a cliff, known locally at "The Look Out".

Government 
Roaches Line is a local service district (LSD) that is governed by a committee responsible for the provision of certain services to the community. The chair of the LSD committee is Morgan Russell.

Notable people 
Joseph R. Smallwood, former premier 
Edward J. Russell, farmer
Joseph R. Smallwood II, businessman

See also 
List of communities in Newfoundland and Labrador
List of designated places in Newfoundland and Labrador
List of local service districts in Newfoundland and Labrador

References 

Populated coastal places in Canada
Designated places in Newfoundland and Labrador
Local service districts in Newfoundland and Labrador